Luke Breust (born 11 November 1990) is an Australian rules footballer who plays for the Hawthorn Football Club in the Australian Football League (AFL). Breust is widely regarded as one of the greatest and most consistent small forwards of his generation.

Early career
Recruited from Temora, New South Wales, Breust played both rugby league and Australian rules football as a junior but turned his focus to Australian rules from age 14.  Breust played football and basketball with Isaac Smith in Temora before the latter moved to Wagga Wagga when he was 13, with both ending up at Hawthorn where they played together in the 2013 AFL Grand Final.

Before being drafted at the age of 18, Breust played as a member of the NSW/ACT Rams.

He was drafted by Hawthorn with selection 47 in the 2009 AFL Rookie Draft in December 2008.
Breust fractured his left tibia during 2008, but after recovering from that injury he received an invitation to trial with the Hawks and was then selected in the draft.

AFL career
In Round 8 of the 2011 AFL season, Breust made his debut against St Kilda after performing well for Hawthorn's affiliate side in the Victorian Football League, Box Hill.  He kicked 2 goals after coming on as a substitute. In Round 15 after a 2-goal, 16-possession game against Collingwood, he was nominated for the 2011 AFL Rising Star Award.

Breust improved more during the 2012 AFL season, particularly with his five-goal effort in Hawthorn's eight-goal win over Collingwood. He played predominantly as a forward, but had short bursts in the midfield throughout the year. Breust played in Hawthorn's losing Grand Final team. At the end of the year, he placed fourth in the Peter Crimmins Medal behind winner Sam Mitchell.

In 2013, Breust kicked a goal in the last quarter of the AFL Grand Final against the Fremantle Dockers to win his first AFL Premiership.

In 2014, Breust began a streak of 29 consecutive goals without scoring a behind, tying with the record set by Tony Lockett in the 1995 season. The streak began during the last quarter of Round 5 against the Geelong Cats and was broken in Round 17 against the Adelaide Crows.

In Round 21, 2017, Bruest kicked his 300th career goal in a 27-point victory over North Melbourne. Bruest was widely regarded as having a below average 2017 season, kicking only 33 goals, his second-lowest annual tally to that date behind only his debut season.

Breust enjoyed a return to form in the 2018 season, with him kicking 53 goals, being a member of the All-Australian team for the second time, and finishing sixth in the Peter Crimmins Medal tally.

Breust had a below-average 2019. Without tall marking targets around them, his combination in the forward line with Jack Gunston was seen as being rather ineffective, with the pair kicking just 60 goals between them, as opposed to 105 the previous season.

On the 18th Feb 2023, Breust was announced as co-captain of Hawthorn Football Club alongside fellow small forward Dylan Moore to support newly announced captain James Sicily.

Statistics
Updated to the end of the 2022 season.

|-
| 2009 ||  || 47
| 0 || — || — || — || — || — || — || — || — || — || — || — || — || — || — || 0
|-
| 2010 ||  || 47
| 0 || — || — || — || — || — || — || — || — || — || — || — || — || — || — || 0
|-
| 2011 ||  || 47
| 17 || 30 || 15 || 116 || 91 || 207 || 56 || 50 || 1.8 || 0.9 || 6.8 || 5.4 || 12.2 || 3.3 || 2.9 || 2
|-
| 2012 ||  || 22
| 24 || 45 || 25 || 175 || 199 || 374 || 77 || 113 || 1.9 || 1.0 || 7.3 || 8.3 || 15.6 || 3.2 || 4.7 || 3
|-
| bgcolor=F0E68C | 2013# ||  || 22
| 25 || 40 || 30 || 192 || 173 || 365 || 91 || 110 || 1.6 || 1.2 || 7.7 || 6.9 || 14.6 || 3.6 || 4.4 || 2
|- 
| bgcolor=F0E68C | 2014# ||  || 22
| 25 || 57 || 12 || 199 || 183 || 382 || 80 || 85 || 2.3 || 0.5 || 8.0 || 7.3 || 15.3 || 3.2 || 3.4 || 5
|-
| bgcolor=F0E68C | 2015# ||  || 22
| 25 || 52 || 19 || 196 || 171 || 367 || 94 || 96 || 2.1 || 0.8 || 7.8 || 6.8 || 14.7 || 3.8 || 3.8 || 3
|-
| 2016 ||  || 22
| 24 || 47 || 27 || 215 || 162 || 377 || 85 || 94 || 2.0 || 1.1 || 9.0 || 6.8 || 15.7 || 3.5 || 3.9 || 1
|-
| 2017 ||  || 22
| 21 || 33 || 17 || 176 || 125 || 301 || 69 || 85 || 1.6 || 0.8 || 8.4 || 6.0 || 14.3 || 3.3 || 4.0 || 0
|-
| 2018 ||  || 22
| 24 || 54 || 24 || 221 || 157 || 378 || 99 || 99 || 2.3 || 1.0 || 9.2 || 6.5 || 15.8 || 4.1 || 4.1 || 7
|-
| 2019 ||  || 22
| 22 || 34 || 17 || 165 || 137 || 302 || 61 || 85 || 1.5 || 0.8 || 7.5 || 6.2 || 13.7 || 2.8 || 3.9 || 2
|-
| 2020 ||  || 22
| 13 || 16 || 6 || 77 || 64 || 141 || 24 || 51 || 1.2 || 0.5 || 5.9 || 4.9 || 10.8 || 1.8 || 3.9 || 0
|-
| 2021 ||  || 22
| 19 || 33 || 11 || 121 || 117 || 238 || 47 || 62 || 1.7 || 0.6 || 6.4 || 6.2 || 12.5 || 2.5 || 3.3 || 0
|-
| 2022 ||  || 22
| 21 || 40 || 19 || 156 || 79 || 235 || 47 || 51 || 1.9 || 0.9 || 7.4 || 3.8 || 11.2 || 2.2 || 2.4 || 3
|- class="sortbottom"
! colspan=3| Career
! 260 !! 481 !! 222 !! 2009 !! 1658 !! 3667 !! 830 !! 981 !! 1.9 !! 0.9 !! 7.7 !! 6.4 !! 14.1 !! 3.2 !! 3.8 !! 28
|}

Notes

Honours and achievements
Team
 3× AFL premiership player: 2013, 2014, 2015
 2× Minor premiership: 2012, 2013

Individual
 2× All-Australian team: 2014, 2018
  vice–captain: 2023–
 4× Hawthorn leading goalkicker: 2018, 2019, 2021, 2022
 2× 22under22 team: 2012, 2013
  most promising player: 2012
 AFL Rising Star nominee: 2011
 2× Australian international rules football team: 2014, 2015
 All-Stars team: 2020
  life member'''

Personal life
Breust's partner is Anthea Pellow, a primary school teacher. He is the cousin of rugby league coach Trent Barrett.

References

External links

 
 

1990 births
Living people
Australian rules footballers from New South Wales
Hawthorn Football Club players
Hawthorn Football Club Premiership players
NSW/ACT Rams players
All-Australians (AFL)
Box Hill Football Club players
Australia international rules football team players
Three-time VFL/AFL Premiership players